The Ovation Channel was created by Optus Television to "present dance, opera, theatre, literature, jazz, classical music, design and even fashion, food and wine", modelling it on Canada's Bravo!, which formerly focused on such programming.

In March 2006, management of the channel was given to Independent Entertainment, a company run by former SBS head Paddy Conroy under a deal that would see Optus retain ownership until 2009.

In November 2009, it was announced that Foxtel had declined to continue broadcasting Ovation on its platform in 2010.
A few days later it was announced that a new arts and entertainment channel run by SBS Television would be replacing Ovation. The following statement was taken from the Ovation Channel's website:

In March 2010 it was announced that the channel would become a la carte from 1 June on the Foxtel and Austar platforms.

Ovation Channel was formerly available on SelecTV until the closure of its English service in late 2010.

On 18 April 2012, AUSTAR stated that as of 31 May 2012 Ovation would cease to broadcast. Ovation later announced that they would continue to be available via the internet, and in the coming months on LG, Samsung, and Panasonic smart TVs.

Fetch TV ceased transmission of Ovation on 27 February 2017. Ovation now exists solely as an online shop, selling DVDs of programming previously broadcast on the channel.

Program categories include:
Art and design
Australian series
Ballet and dance
Classical music and opera
Concerts, jazz and song
Drama, theatre and film
Literature
People and profiles
Specials and musicals

External links

References

Television channels and stations established in 1997
Television channels and stations disestablished in 2017
Television networks in Australia
English-language television stations in Australia